Apartaderos is a small Andean town in Mérida State, Venezuela.

In addition to tourism the main activities are agriculture, flower cultivation and crafts. In terms of climate, January, the coldest month, averages , while the hottest month, June, averages .

Apartaderos sits at the intersection of three river valleys: the Chama which flows down to the city of Mérida, the Santo Domingo which flows to Los Llanos (plains) of Barinas, and the Motatán, which flows to the city of Valera. The striking landscape around Apartaderos has inspired native American myth and poetry.

See also
List of highest towns by country

References

Populated places in Mérida (state)
Extreme points of Venezuela